Robert Inglis Campbell (28 June 1922 – 4 May 2009) was a Scottish footballer, who played during the 1940s and 1950s. He was born in Glasgow.

A winger, Campbell's playing career consisted of spells with Falkirk, Chelsea (departing after seven years at the club, one season prior to their 1954–55 Football League win) and Reading. He also played for Queens Park Rangers as a "guest" during the Second World War. He won five caps for the Scotland national team between 1947 and 1950. He scored his only Scotland goal against Switzerland in April 1950.

Upon retiring Campbell became a coach with Reading, before taking the manager's position at Dumbarton in 1961. He left Boghead Park a year later and assumed a scouting role with Bristol Rovers for the next 15 years. He was promoted to manager of the Gasheads in November 1977, leaving in December 1979. His last managerial appointment was with Gloucester City.

References

External links

Scotland Profile at Londonhearts.com

1922 births
2009 deaths
Footballers from Glasgow
Chelsea F.C. players
Falkirk F.C. players
Reading F.C. players
Scotland international footballers
Scottish footballers
Scottish football managers
Dumbarton F.C. managers
Bristol Rovers F.C. managers
Gloucester City A.F.C. managers
Association football wingers
Scottish Football League players
Glasgow Perthshire F.C. players
Scottish Junior Football Association players
English Football League players
English Football League managers
Scottish Football League managers
Reading F.C. non-playing staff
Queens Park Rangers F.C. wartime guest players